In the United States, the Triple Crown of Thoroughbred Racing, commonly known as the Triple Crown, is a series of horse races for three-year-old Thoroughbreds, consisting of the Kentucky Derby, Preakness Stakes, and Belmont Stakes. The three races were inaugurated in different years, the last being the Kentucky Derby in 1875. The Triple Crown Trophy, commissioned in 1950 but awarded to all previous winners as well as those after 1950, is awarded to a horse who wins all three races and is thereafter designated as a Triple Crown winner. The races are traditionally run in May and early June of each year, although global events have resulted in schedule adjustments, such as in 1945 and 2020.

The first winner of all three Triple Crown races was Sir Barton in 1919. Some journalists began using the term Triple Crown to refer to the three races as early as 1923, but it was not until Gallant Fox won the three events in 1930 that Charles Hatton of the Daily Racing Form put the term into common use.

13 horses have won the Triple Crown: Sir Barton (1919), Gallant Fox (1930), Omaha (1935), War Admiral (1937), Whirlaway (1941), Count Fleet (1943), Assault (1946), Citation (1948), Secretariat (1973), Seattle Slew (1977), Affirmed (1978), American Pharoah (2015), and Justify (2018). , American Pharoah and Justify are the only living Triple Crown winners.

James E. "Sunny Jim" Fitzsimmons was the first trainer to win the Triple Crown more than once; he trained both Gallant Fox and Omaha for the Belair Stud. Gallant Fox and Omaha are also the only father-son pair to each win the Triple Crown. Bob Baffert became the second trainer to win the Triple Crown more than once, training American Pharoah and Justify. Belair Stud and Calumet Farm are tied as owners with the most Triple Crown victories with two apiece; Calumet's winners were Whirlaway and Citation. Eddie Arcaro rode both of Calumet's Triple Crown champions and is the only jockey to win more than one Triple Crown. The African-American jockey Willie Simms is the only African-American jockey to win all three races that would compose the triple crown. During the 1898 Preakness Stakes he rode a different horse, Sly Fox (horse) and won the race.

Secretariat holds the stakes record time for each of the three races. His time of 2:24 for  miles in the 1973 Belmont Stakes also set a world record that still stands.

Development
The three Triple Crown races had existed long before the series received its name: the Belmont Stakes was first run in 1867, the Preakness in 1873, and the Kentucky Derby in 1875. The term “triple crown” was in use at least by 1923, although Daily Racing Form writer Charles Hatton is commonly credited with originating the term in 1930.

The order in which the races are run has varied. From 1932 through 2019, the Kentucky Derby was run first, followed by the Preakness, and then the Belmont. Running the three races in a five-week span was instituted in 1969. The Preakness was run before the Kentucky Derby 11 times, most recently in 1931. Two times— May 12, 1917, and May 13, 1922 — the Kentucky Derby and Preakness were run on the same day.

Scheduling has occasionally been affected by global events. During World War II, the 1945 Kentucky Derby was moved from May 5 to June 9, with the Preakness and Belmont following on June 16 and June 23, respectively. In 2020, the Triple Crown was altered from its usual sequence due to the effects of the COVID-19 pandemic. The adjusted schedule started with the Belmont Stakes on June 20, at the shortened distance of  miles (9 furlongs). The Kentucky Derby ran on September 5, and finally the Preakness on October 3. 2020 also marked the first time for the Belmont Stakes to be run as the opening leg of the Triple Crown.

Each Triple Crown race is open to both colts and fillies. Although fillies have won each of the individual Triple Crown races, none has won the Triple Crown itself.  Despite attempts to develop a "Filly Triple Crown" or a "Triple Tiara" for fillies only, no set series of three races has consistently remained in the public eye, and at least four different types of races have been used.  Two fillies won the series of the Kentucky Oaks, the Pimlico Oaks (now the Black-Eyed Susan Stakes), and the Coaching Club American Oaks, in 1949 and 1952, but the racing press did not designate either accomplishment as a "Triple Crown".  In 1961, the New York Racing Association created a filly Triple Crown of in-state races only, but the races changed over the years.  Eight fillies won the NYRA Triple Tiara between 1968 and 1993.

Gelded colts may run in any of the three races today, but they were prohibited from entering the Belmont between 1919 and 1957. Geldings have won each of the individual races, but like fillies, no gelding has ever won the Triple Crown. The closest was Funny Cide, who won the Derby and the Preakness in 2003.

Each of the races is held on a dirt track, rather than the turf surfaces commonly used for important races elsewhere in the world.

Winners

At completion of the 2016 season, the three Triple Crown races have attracted 4,224 entrants. Of these, 292 horses have won a single leg of the Triple Crown, 52 horses have won two of the races (23 the Kentucky Derby and Preakness Stakes, 18 the Preakness Stakes and Belmont Stakes, and 11 the Kentucky Derby and Belmont Stakes), and 13 horses have won all three races. Pillory won both the Preakness Stakes and Belmont Stakes in 1922, a year when it was impossible to win the Triple Crown because the Kentucky Derby and Preakness Stakes were run on the same day.

10 of the 13 winners have been "homebreds", owned at the time of their win by their breeders.

Jim Fitzsimmons and Bob Baffert are the only two trainers to have two horses win the Triple Crown, with Fitzsimmons training the sire/son combination of 1930 winner Gallant Fox and 1935 winner Omaha and Baffert training 2015 winner American Pharoah and 2018 winner Justify. The wins by Fitzsimmons were also the first time that an owner and the first time that a breeder, Belair Stud holding both duties, had a repeat win of the Triple Crown. Calumet Farm is the only other owner with two Triple Crown horses, 1941 winner Whirlaway and 1948 winner Citation. Eddie Arcaro is the only jockey to ride two horses to the Triple Crown, both for Calumet, Whirlaway and Citation. Those two horses' trainers, Ben Jones and Jimmy Jones, were father and son.

All 13 horses were foaled in the United States. Most owners, trainers, and jockeys were American-born, though there were number of exceptions: jockey Johnny Longden was born in England and raised in Canada; Ron Turcotte was Canadian. French-born jockey Jean Cruguet; and jockey Victor Espinoza, from Mexico. Jockey Willie Saunders is considered a Canadian jockey because he spent part of his childhood there, but was born in Montana. Laz Barrera, trainer of Affirmed, was from Cuba; Secretariat's trainer, Lucien Laurin was Canadian. Owner Fannie Hertz was married to John D. Hertz, who was born in Slovakia; owner Ahmed Zayat was born in Egypt. The horse Sir Barton was foaled in the United States but had a Canadian owner,  J. K. L. Ross, at the time of his Triple Crown win. Justify's large ownership group included individuals from both the United States and China.

Records 
Secretariat holds the stakes record for each of the Triple Crown races, the Kentucky Derby (1:59 2/5), the Preakness Stakes (1:53), and the Belmont Stakes (2:24).

At 18, Steve Cauthen became the youngest jockey to win the Triple Crown, riding Affirmed in 1978. At 52, Mike Smith became the oldest jockey to win the Triple Crown, riding Justify in 2018.

Other notable achievements
Only one horse, Alydar, placed (finished second) in all three races. He was defeated each time by Affirmed in 1978 by a combined margin of two lengths. His trainer John Veitch is the only trainer to have done this with one horse. In 1995, D. Wayne Lukas became the first and only major figure (owner, jockey, or trainer) to win all three Triple Crown races with different horses, Thunder Gulch in the Derby and Belmont, Timber Country in the Preakness.  Lukas also is the only trainer to have won six consecutive Triple Crown races, adding his 1995 wins, having won the 1994 Preakness and Belmont with Tabasco Cat and the 1996 Derby with Grindstone.

Like Veitch, only with two different horses, Bob Baffert also had second-place finishes in all three legs of the Triple Crown, both owned by Ahmed Zayat: in 2012, Bodemeister finished second in the Kentucky Derby and Preakness stakes to I'll Have Another, then Paynter was entered and finished second to Union Rags.  Baffert and Zayat teamed up again for the 2015 Triple Crown victory of American Pharoah.

Gallant Fox is the only Triple Crown winner to sire another U.S. Triple Crown winner, Omaha. Affirmed sired Peteski, winner of the 1993 Canadian Triple Crown.

Jockey Julie Krone became the first (and currently only) woman to win a Triple Crown race when she won the 1993 Belmont Stakes aboard Colonial Affair.

Whirlaway, in addition to winning the 1941 Triple Crown, also won the Travers Stakes that year, the first and only horse to date to accomplish that feat. American Pharoah, in addition to winning the 2015 Triple Crown, also won the Breeders' Cup Classic that year. As the Breeders' Cup was not established until 1984, American Pharoah was the first (and currently only) horse to sweep those four races, a feat now known as the Grand Slam.

Gaps between wins

After the first Triple Crown winner, Sir Barton, in 1919, there was not another winner until Gallant Fox in 1930, a gap of 11 years. Between 1930 and 1948, seven horses won the Triple Crown, with five years being the longest gap between winners. However, following the 1948 win of Citation, there was a considerable gap of 25 years before Secretariat ended the drought of Triple Crown champions in 1973. Between 1973 and 1978, there were three Triple Crown winners.

After Affirmed's Triple Crown in 1978, the longest drought in Triple Crown history began in 1979 with Spectacular Bid's failed Triple Crown attempt when he finished third in the Belmont. It lasted until American Pharoah won in 2015.

Between 1979 and 2014, thirteen horses won both the Derby and Preakness, but not the Belmont. Of those, Real Quiet came the closest, losing the Belmont Stakes by a nose in 1998. Another dramatic near-miss was Charismatic, who led the Belmont Stakes in the final furlong in 1999, but fractured his left front leg in the final stretch and fell back to third. Five other horses lost the Kentucky Derby but won the Preakness and the Belmont, and three won the Derby and the Belmont, but not the Preakness.

The 37-year gap between the Triple Crown wins of Affirmed and American Pharoah drew criticism of the system. As far back as 1986, reporters noted that horses who were fresh for the Belmont had an advantage.  In 2003, Gary Stevens stated in an interview with Charlie Rose that he did not believe there would be another Triple Crown winner because of the tendency for owners to put fresh horses in the Preakness and Belmont Stakes. California Chrome co-owner Steve Coburn was particularly critical of the Triple Crown system in post-Belmont remarks in 2014; he considered the system to be unfair, arguing that there would never be another Triple Crown winner in his lifetime unless only horses that competed in the Kentucky Derby and Preakness competed at the Belmont. By 2014, six of the previous eight Belmont winners had not competed in either of the first two legs of the Triple Crown.  Additionally, from 2006 to 2014, the Belmont winner was a horse who had not competed in the Preakness.

Unsuccessful bids

Since all three events were inaugurated, as of 2022, 23 horses have won the Derby and Preakness but not the Belmont (ten of which placed):
1932: Burgoo King did not enter the Belmont due to lameness.:78, 182
1936: Bold Venture did not enter the Belmont due to lameness.:78, 182
1944: Pensive was the first horse to contest but lose the Belmont after winning the first two legs. He placed second to Bounding Home,:78 who had neither run in the Derby nor the Preakness.
1958: Tim Tam, defeated by six lengths by Cavan, who had neither contested the Derby nor Preakness.
1961: Carry Back, "sore" after the race, was seventh of nine entries,  lengths behind the winner, a longshot named Sherluck.
1964: Northern Dancer, defeated by Quadrangle.
1966: Kauai King, defeated by Amberoid.
1968: Forward Pass, defeated by Stage Door Johnny by  lengths.
1969: Majestic Prince, second by  lengths to Arts and Letters. Loss attributed to fatigue and lameness.
1971: Cañonero II, fourth in the Belmont to 34–1 longshot Pass Catcher, the loss attributed to a hoof problem.
1979: Spectacular Bid, third in Belmont, was alleged to have stepped on a safety pin the morning of the race, though another theory blamed rider error by an inexperienced young jockey moving him too soon. He finished  lengths behind Coastal and a neck behind the second-place horse, Golden Act.
1981: Pleasant Colony, third in Belmont,  lengths behind Summing and the second-place horse, Highland Blade.
1987: Alysheba finished fourth in Belmont behind Bet Twice, Cryptoclearance, and Gulch.
1989: Sunday Silence, second in Belmont, eight lengths behind Easy Goer.
1997: Silver Charm, second in Belmont,  length behind Touch Gold.
1998: Real Quiet, second in Belmont after a photo finish, a nose behind Victory Gallop.
1999: Charismatic, third in Belmont,  lengths behind Lemon Drop Kid and second-place Vision and Verse. Charismatic was pulled up soon after the finish, vanned off with a bone fracture. He survived and was retired to stud.
2002: War Emblem stumbled at gate in Belmont, finished eighth out of 11. Winner Sarava scored upset at record odds of 70–1.
2003: Funny Cide, third in Belmont, five lengths behind Empire Maker, and  lengths behind second-place horse, Ten Most Wanted.
2004: Smarty Jones, second in Belmont, one length behind Birdstone.
2008: Big Brown was pulled up in the home stretch of the Belmont, eased to a last-place finish. Winner was Da' Tara. A hoof problem had limited Big Brown's training, and may have been a factor in his defeat.
2012: I'll Have Another was scratched from the Belmont the day before the race due to a tendon injury.
2014: California Chrome finished in a dead heat for 4th in the Belmont after being stepped on by another horse leaving the gate and running the race with an injury to his heel and a scrape on his tendon.

Another 30 horses have won two of the three triple crown races in other combinations.

Sponsorship and broadcasting
The first national television broadcast of a Triple Crown race occurred with the 1948 Belmont Stakes on CBS. The Preakness Stakes was first broadcast on television in 1949, and the Kentucky Derby was first televised in 1952. Originally, the three races largely organized their own nominations procedure, marketing and television broadcast rights. In 1985, Triple Crown Productions was created when the owner of Spend a Buck chose not to run in the other two Triple Crown races because of a financial incentive offered to any Kentucky Derby winner who could win a set of competing races in New Jersey. The organizers of the three races realized that they needed to work together.

Efforts to unify the sponsorship and marketing of all three Triple Crown races began in 1987 when ABC Sports negotiated a deal with Chrysler to pay $5 million to any horse that swept all three races, and $1 million each year there was no Triple Crown sweep to the horse with the highest combined Triple Crown finish.  This sponsorship lasted until 1993. The end of the $1 million participation bonus was linked to the breakdown of Prairie Bayou at the Belmont Stakes that year and the uncomfortable situation that arose when the Kentucky Derby winner, Sea Hero, was given the bonus following a seventh-place finish.

In 1995, Visa USA took over the sponsorship with a 10-year contract, naming the series the Visa Triple Crown and offering only the $5 million bonus to a horse that could sweep the Triple Crown. Along with sponsorship by VISA, NBC Sports paid $51.5 million for broadcast rights to all three races, with the revenue split giving 50% of the total to Churchill Downs and 25% each to Pimlico and to the New York Racing Association (NYRA).

The Visa deal—and the cooperative effort—ended after 2005. The NYRA felt that they did not get a fair share of the revenue, particularly when the Belmont had the highest ratings of all three races in the years where a Triple Crown was on the line.  From 2001 through 2013, average viewership for the Belmont was 7 million when the Triple Crown was not at stake, whereas viewership averaged 13 million when it was.  With the contract term ending, the NYRA went to ESPN on ABC for the 2006 Belmont, while the broadcasts of the Derby and Preakness remained with NBC. Visa chose to remain as a sponsor of only Kentucky Derby for the next five years. As a result of the divided broadcast, Triple Crown Productions was unable to obtain a new sponsor.

Today Triple Crown Productions LLC, based at Churchill Downs, is responsible for collecting nominations to the annual Triple Crown races.

In February 2011, ABC/ESPN dropped out of the negotiations to renew broadcast rights to the Belmont Stakes. NBC obtained the contract through 2015, once again uniting all three races on the same network.  In 2014, NBC extended their contract for the Kentucky Derby through 2025. NBC then obtained broadcast contracts for the Preakness and Belmont through 2022. 

FOX Sports announced in January 2022 that it had acquired the broadcast rights to the Belmont Stakes for eight years beginning in 2023.

Individual race winners

Notes

 [Fy] Denotes a filly. Fillies won the Kentucky Derby in 1915, 1980, and 1988, Preakness Stakes in 1903, 1906, 1915, 1924, 2009, and 2020, and Belmont Stakes in 1867, 1905, and 2007.
 RNR Race not run. The Belmont was not run in 1911 and 1912 due to anti-betting legislation passed in New York State. The Preakness did not run 1891–1893.

See also

 American thoroughbred racing top attended events
 British Classic Races
 French Classic Races
 Triple Crown of Thoroughbred Racing
 Grand Slam of Thoroughbred racing

References

External links
Official website
BloodHorse.com Triple Crown Mania
Ten Things You Should Know About the Triple Crown at Hello Race Fans
Triple Crown Winners – slideshow by Life magazine

Belmont Stakes
Kentucky Derby
Preakness Stakes
Triple Crown of Thoroughbred Racing